Raoul Cesar "Nash" Escueta Racela (born November 30, 1971) is a Filipino professional basketball coach.

Nash Racela was a graduate of De La Salle University before taking on a career as a coach. He also coached the Philippine squad that participated at the 2016 SEABA Cup.

Coaching record

Collegiate record

Professional record

Personal life
Racela is the younger brother of Olsen Racela, who is a former professional basketball player and took over Nash's position as the head coach of the FEU Tamaraws.

References

1971 births
Living people
Filipino men's basketball coaches
Powerade Tigers coaches
Philippines men's national basketball team coaches
De La Salle University alumni
San Beda Red Lions basketball coaches
San Miguel Beermen coaches
TNT Tropang Giga coaches
FEU Tamaraws basketball coaches
Blackwater Bossing coaches
Adamson Soaring Falcons basketball coaches